Nanga Pinoh is the principal town and administrative centre of Melawi Regency, West Kalimantan, Indonesia. The population of Nanga Pinoh was 54,424 in the 2020 Census. The town is positioned at the junction of the Melawi River and the Pinoh River. A statue of a warrior known to the Melawi people Apang Semangai stands in the town centre.

Transportation 
Nanga Pinoh can be reached by air through Nanga Pinoh Airport, though flights are infrequent and the airport has limited destinations. A bus station is located just north of the town centre.

References 

Populated places in West Kalimantan
Regency seats of West Kalimantan